Długokąty may refer to the following places in Poland:
Długokąty, Lower Silesian Voivodeship (south-west Poland)
Długokąty, Mława County in Masovian Voivodeship (east-central Poland)
Długokąty, Żyrardów County in Masovian Voivodeship (east-central Poland)